Xyroptila masaia is a moth of the family Pterophoridae which is endemic to Kenya.

References

External links

Moths described in 2006
Endemic moths of Kenya
masaia
Moths of Africa